Air Vice-Marshal Suraya Antonia Marshall,  (born 1973) is a senior Royal Air Force officer, serving as Air Officer Commanding No. 2 Group RAF since October 2021.

Education and career
She was educated at Queen Margaret's School, York, a private school. She then studied law at University of Nottingham, graduating with a Bachelor of Laws (LLB) degree in 1994.

Marshall joined the Royal Air Force (RAF) as a navigator in 1994. She completed an MA from King's College London in 2000. She flew in the Tornado F3, and in 2000 became the first woman to pass the Qualified Weapons Instructor Course for the Tornado F3. She served as Officer Commanding of No. 92 Squadron RAF and No. 55 Squadron RAF. She was Director of Coalition Air Operations in the Middle East and Afghanistan during 2019.

In November 2019, Marshall was appointed Commandant of the Royal Air Force College Cranwell, the RAF's aircrew and officer training academy, holding the rank of air commodore. On 6 October 2021 she was promoted to air vice-marshal and appointed Air Officer Commanding No. 2 Group: she is the first woman to command one of the RAF's two operational groups. She is the highest ranking BAME person in the British military.

Marshall was appointed a Commander of the Order of the British Empire in the 2022 Birthday Honours.

Personal life
Marshall is married to Air Vice-Marshal Allan Marshall, and together they have two children.

See also
List of senior female officers of the British Armed Forces

References

 

 
 

 
 
 

1973 births
Living people
People educated at Queen Margaret's School, York
Alumni of the University of Nottingham
Alumni of King's College London
British navigators
British women aviators
British flight instructors
Female air marshals of the Royal Air Force
Women academic administrators
Commandants of the Royal Air Force College Cranwell
Women in the Royal Air Force
20th-century Royal Air Force personnel
21st-century Royal Air Force personnel
Royal Air Force personnel of the Iraq War
Royal Air Force personnel of the War in Afghanistan (2001–2021)
Commanders of the Order of the British Empire